Thurston House may refer to:

Places
Thurston House (Little Rock, Arkansas), listed on the NRHP in Arkansas
Thurston-Chase Cabin, Centerville, Utah, listed on the NRHP in Utah
Phineas Thurston House, Barnet, Vermont, listed on the NRHP in Vermont
Thurston House, East Lothian, in Dunbar, Scotland, rebuilt by John Kinross from 1890 onwards

Book
Thurston House (book), a novel by Danielle Steel